The 1941 Massachusetts State Aggies football team was an American football team that represented Massachusetts State College as an independent during the 1941 college football season. In their first season under head coach Walter Hargesheimer, the Aggies compiled a 3–4–1 record. They played their home games at Alumni Field in Amherst, Massachusetts.

Schedule

References

Massachusetts State
UMass Minutemen football seasons
Massachusetts State Aggies football